Elizabeth Rodriguez is an American actress. She is best known for her role as Aleida Diaz in the Netflix comedy-drama series Orange Is the New Black (2013–2019). She received a Tony Award nomination and won an Outer Critics Circle Award and a Theatre World Award for her performance in Stephen Adly Guirgis' 2011 play The Motherfucker with the Hat. In 2015, she starred in the first season of AMC's post-apocalyptic horror drama series Fear the Walking Dead. She also played Gabriela Lopez in the 2017 film Logan.

Early life
Rodriguez was born to Puerto Rican parents and raised in Manhattan, New York City. She went to Brandeis High School and Lehman College in the Bronx.

Career

1990s

While still studying, Rodriguez began appearing on-screen in small parts in films like Fresh (1994) and television shows such as New York Undercover, New York News, Law & Order, NYPD Blue and Oz.

2000s
She has appeared in a number of stage productions, television shows and independent films. She was nominated for a Tony Award for Best Featured Actress in a Play and won Outer Critics Circle Award, as well as a Theatre World Award, for her role on Broadway play in Stephen Adly Guirgis's The Motherfucker with the Hat. She was nominated for an Imagen Award for her role in the feature film Tio Papi (2013), and co-starred as Gina Calabrese in Michael Mann's Miami Vice (2006). From 2008 to 2009, she played the role of Carmen Morales on the ABC daytime soap opera All My Children.

2010s
In 2011, she had a series regular role on the short-lived NBC police drama series, Prime Suspect.

In 2013, Rodriguez began appearing in the recurring role of Aleida Diaz in the Netflix comedy-drama series, Orange Is the New Black; she was promoted to series regular in 2015. Along with the rest of the cast she received Screen Actors Guild Award for Outstanding Performance by an Ensemble in a Comedy Series in both 2015 and 2016. Rodriguez also had recurring roles as Paz Valdes in the Starz drama series Power, and as Special Agent Chavez in the NBC police procedural Grimm.

In 2015, Rodriguez was cast in the series regular role on the AMC post-apocalyptic drama Fear the Walking Dead, the companion series for The Walking Dead. In 2017, she appeared in Hugh Jackman's final Wolverine film Logan directed by James Mangold.

2020s
In June 2021, Rodriguez voiced Rafa Martez in the Star Wars: The Bad Batch episode "Decommissioned".

Filmography

Film

Television

Theater

Awards and nominations

References

External links

20th-century American actresses
21st-century American actresses
American film actresses
American stage actresses
American television actresses
Living people
American actresses of Puerto Rican descent
Hispanic and Latino American actresses
Lehman College alumni
Year of birth missing (living people)